The 1978 NFL Championship Series was the third edition of the NFL Night Series, an NFL-organised national club Australian rules football tournament between the leading clubs from the SANFL, the WANFL, the VFA and State Representative Teams.

The 1978 NFL edition continued on a similar basis to the previous season with the VFL again running their own Night Series at VFL Park. However, the first signs of a breakaway appeared with the Tasmanian Representative Side choosing to participate in both the NFL and VFL competitions – making them the first non-VFL team to play in the VFL Night Series.

Qualified teams

1 Includes previous appearances in the Championship of Australia.

Venues

Knockout stage

Round 1

Quarter-finals

Semi-finals

NFL Championship Series final

References

Australian rules interstate football
History of Australian rules football
Australian rules football competitions in Australia
1978 in Australian rules football